Estaca de Bares Lighthouse is an active 19th century lighthouse in Estaca de Bares in the Province of A Coruña, Galicia, Spain.

It was built in 1850, and has a  tower.

See also

 List of lighthouses in Spain

References

External links

 Comisión de faros

Lighthouses completed in 1850
Lighthouses in Galicia (Spain)
Buildings and structures in the Province of A Coruña